J. Frank Elsass (March 3, 1913 – January 1, 1981) was an American cornet soloist. He was the assistant cornet soloist with the Goldman Band from 1934 to 1940. He was also a member of the Barre Little Symphony from 1937 to 1940.

Early life
John Frank Elsass was born on March 3, 1913, in Waynesburg, Ohio, the son of John W. Elsass and Florence L. Dieringer. Professionally, he went by the name "Frank Elsass".

Education
Frank Elsass earned a master's degree in Music from New York University and a doctorate from the University of Texas. He was a student at the Ernest Williams School of Music and later served on the faculty there.

The Goldman Band
In 1934, Edwin Franko Goldman discovered Frank Elsass and hired him at age 19 to be a cornet soloist in the Goldman Band, assisting Del Staigers. Elsass stayed with the band through the 1940 season, serving as a reliable assistant cornet soloist to Del Staigers, David Rosebrook and Leonard B. Smith (Musician), as well as a member of the famed Goldman Band cornet trio "The Three Aces".

Faculty Positions
In 1941, Frank Elsass accepted a position as a brass instructor at San Jose State College. He left this position in 1942 and joined the US Navy, serving there through 1945.
In 1948 he accepted a position as professor of trumpet and cornet and conductor of the symphonic band at the University of Texas at Austin where he remained through 1978.

Awards
American Bandmasters Association 1966

Death
Frank Elsass died of a rare and little known disease at the age of 67 on January 1, 1981. He is interred at Sandy Valley Cemetery, Waynesburg, Ohio.

References

1913 births
1981 deaths
American cornetists
People from Stark County, Ohio